Rhodium(III) perchlorate refers to the inorganic compound with the formula Rh(H2O)6(ClO4)3. It is a hygroscopic yellow solid.  It is the perchlorate salt of the tricationic aquo complex [Rh(H2O)6]3+. The compound is prepared by treating hydrated rhodium(III) chloride and perchloric acid at elevated temperatures:
[Rh(H2O)6]Cl3  +  3 HClO4  →  [Rh(H2O)6](ClO4)3  +  3 HCl

The reaction of rhodium(III) hydroxide with concentrated perchloric acid also produce rhodium(III) perchlorate.
 Rh(OH)3 + 3 HClO4 → Rh(ClO4)3 + 3 H2O

References

Rhodium(III) compounds
Perchlorates